Charles T. Blackfan (March 1848 – February 28, 1907) was an American politician in the state of Washington. He served in the Washington House of Representatives from 1889 to 1891.

References

Republican Party members of the Washington House of Representatives
1848 births
1907 deaths
Place of birth missing
19th-century American politicians